William Paston, 2nd Earl of Yarmouth (1654 – 25 December 1732) of Oxnead, Norfolk and Turnham Green, Chiswick, Middlesex was a British peer and politician.

Born in 1654, he was the son of Robert Paston, 1st Earl of Yarmouth and his wife, Rebecca, née Clayton and was educated at Trinity College, Cambridge.  He succeeded his father as 2nd Earl of Yarmouth in 1683, inheriting his estate and Oxnead Hall.

Paston was elected Member of Parliament for Norwich from 1678. In 1679, when his father was made an earl, William adopted the style of Lord Paston. He continued to represent Norwich until he inherited his father's title.

He converted to Roman Catholicism and in February 1687, James II appointed him Treasurer of the Household. He was also appointed joint Lord-Lieutenant of Wiltshire and Custos Rotulorum of Wiltshire in 1688.

He reconverted to Anglicanism in 1689, but refused to swear allegiance to William and Mary when they came to the throne that year, subsequently losing all his offices.

Suspected of Jacobitism, he was imprisoned twice, but was admitted to the House of Lords in 1696. He was briefly Vice-Admiral of Norfolk in 1719.

He was elected a Fellow of the Royal Society in 1722.

Private life
Yarmouth died heavily in debt on 25 December 1732 at Epsom, Surrey, aged seventy-eight. In 1671, he had married the widowed Charlotte FitzRoy, the illegitimate daughter of Charles II and Elizabeth Killigrew. They had four children who survived childhood, though only one survived him:

Charles Paston, Lord Paston (1673–1718)
Lady Charlotte Paston (1675–1736), married Thomas Herne.
Lady Rebecca Paston (1681–1726), married Sir John Holland, 2nd Baronet.
Hon. William Paston (1682–1711)

His wife having died in 1684, he married Elizabeth Wiseman (the widow of Sir Robert Wiseman and daughter of Dudley North, 4th Baron North) in March 1687.

As his sons, his brothers and their male heirs had predeceased him, his titles became extinct. His heavily mortgaged estate had to be sold.

See also
Paston, Norfolk

References

Sources
John Miller, Paston, Robert, first earl of Yarmouth (1631–1683), Oxford Dictionary of National Biography, Oxford University Press, Sept 2004; online edn, Jan 2008, accessed 26 May 2008

1654 births
1732 deaths
Alumni of Trinity College, Cambridge
Converts to Roman Catholicism from Anglicanism
Lord-Lieutenants of Wiltshire
Treasurers of the Household
17th-century Anglicans
17th-century Roman Catholics
English MPs 1661–1679
English MPs 1679
English MPs 1680–1681
English MPs 1681
Fellows of the Royal Society
Earls of Yarmouth (1679 creation)
William